Nagapattinam is a Lok Sabha constituency in Tamil Nadu. Its Tamil Nadu Parliamentary Constituency number is 29 of 39. The seat is reserved for scheduled castes. Dalit agricultural workers form a large part of the electorate in the constituency. The constituency is noted for being an historically communist stronghold, having elected Communist Party of India parliamentary representative seven times.

The constituency is at the tail end of the Cauvery delta. The area is prone to both floods and droughts. The Cauvery water crisis, affecting agriculture in the area, remains high on the agenda in Nagapattinam Lok Sabha constituency. Apart from farming, there is an oil refinery and some minor industrial units.

Demography and Dynamics
Dalits (Scheduled Castes) constitute the largest community in the Nagapattinam Lok Sabha constituency, representing 32.95% of the population. The two other largest communities are Vellalars and Mukkulathors.

Muslims constitute the fourth largest community in the constituency, as of the late 1990s representing 9% of the population. The Muslim population is concentrated in Nagapattinam Nagoor

Political dynamics 

Nagapattinam Lok Sabha constituency is often seen as a traditional communist stronghold. The constituency has a large electorate of agricultural labourers. Nevertheless, the six assembly segments of the constituency display distinct political traditions and dynamics.

The Nagapattinam assembly constituency, with strong presence of fishing communities, is traditionally dominated by AIADMK. Tiruvarur assembly constituency, on the other hand, is the home area of DMK supremo M. Karunanidhi. Another traditional DMK stronghold is Vedaranyam. Vedaranyam is a largely Vanniyar assembly constituency, were DMK cultivated a strong influence based on patron-client political relationships. The assembly constituency is home to salt refineries, as well as prawn cultivation and fishing activities.

Thiruthuraipoondi assembly constituency is the seen as the foremost CPI stronghold in the area. Thiruthuraipoondi elected CPI state legislators ten times. Notably CPI managed to win the state assembly seat even in 1991, when Congress-AIADMK defeated the DMK-led front (including CPI) in a landslide victory after the Rajiv Gandhi assassination.

The Kilvelur assembly constituency, formed after delimitation, includes areas were CPI(M) is strong. In the delimitation process the Keechankuppan and Akkarapettai were moved from Nagapattinam assembly constituency to the Kilvelur constituency. The Kilvelur assembly constituency is dominated by poor farmers and agricultural labourers. The 1968 Kilvenmani massacre of Dalit agricultural labourers shaped the political map in the area.

Assembly Segments 
The Nagapattinam Lok Sabha constituency is composed of six state assembly constituencies:

Before 2009:

1.Nannilam (SC)

2.Thiruvarur (SC)

3.Nagapattinam

4.Vedharanyam

5.Thiruthuraipoondi (SC)

6.Mannarkudi

Members of the Parliament

 Due to the death of S.G. Murugaiyan, a by-election was held.

Election Results

General Election 2019

General Election 2014

General Election 2009

Detailed Election History

Double-seat constituency
Nagapattinam Lok Sabha constituency, then in the Madras State, was constituted for the 1957 Indian general election. In the 1957 election Nagapattinam elected two parliamentarians, one general seat and one seat reserved for Scheduled Castes. CPI fielded two prominent leaders, P. Ramamurthi and A.K. Subbiah, in Nagapattinam. Nevertheless both seats were won by Indian National Congress candidates. For the Scheduled Caste seat M. Ayyakkannu of Congress obtained 216,890 votes (51.25%), A.K. Subbiah 151,704 votes (35.85%) and independent candidate V. Veeraswamy 54,597 votes (12.90%). For the general seat K.R. Sambandam of Congress obtained 252,275 votes (49.18%), P. Ramamurthi of CPI 124,205 votes (24.21%), independent candidate K. Manoharam 78,983 votes (15.40%) and independent candidate S.M.R. Arumugan Pillai 57,507 (11.21%).

1960s
In the 1962 Indian general election Congress fielded Gopalsamy Thenkondar as its candidate in Nagapattinam. Thenkondar won the seat, obtaining 45.98% of the vote, defeating C. Kandasamy Thevar of CPI (36.74%), A.M. Mytheen Sayabu of the Muslim League (16.07%) and independent candidate Mohamed Cassim Rowther (1.21%).

After the 1964 split in the CPI, the break-away Communist Party of India (Marxist) emerged as the dominant communist faction in Nagapattinam taluk whilst CPI remained the larger party in the other taluks in the area. In 1964 CPI(M) formed the Tamil Nadu Tillers Association in Nagapattinam.

Congress had support from middle-class sectors and middle-caste farmers. The Swatantra Party had a presence in the area, based amongst Brahmin mirasdhars.

In the 1967 Indian general election three candidates contested the Nagapattinam seat. CPI(M) had fielded the prominent trade union leader V.P. Sinthan. CPI fielded M. Kathamuthu and Congress fielded V. Sambasivam. Together the CPI and CPI(M) candidates accounted for the majority of the votes, but the Congress candidate won. CPI argued that it had withdrawn its candidate in Coimbatore but that CPI(M) had not responded well to that gesture, and thus CPI insisted on fielding a candidate of its own in Nagapattinam. Notably Nagapattinam recorded the highest voter turnout nationwide with 84.69% in the 1967 election.

1970s
In the 1971 Indian general election three candidates contested the Nagapattinam seat: the incumbent V. Sambasivan (now representing Congress(O)), M. Kathamuthu (CPI) and G. Bharatimohan (CPI(M)). M. Kathamuthu won the seat with 54.95% of the votes, with V. Sambasivan and G. Bharatimohan obtaining 33% and 12.05% respectively.

Ahead of the 1977 Indian general election CPI was allocated Nagapattinam as part of the Congress-AIADMK seat sharing alliance. For this election Nagapattinam had been identified as reserved for Scheduled Castes. There were only two candidates in the fray, S.G. Murugaiyan of CPI and Thazhai M. Karunanidhi of the Dravida Munnetra Kazhagam. S.G. Murugaiyan won the seat, obtaining 53.95% of the vote.

In January 1979 S.G. Murugaiyan was assassinated. CPI blamed 'AIADMK goondas' for the murder. A mass protest was held in Mannargudi after the killing, CPI claimed around a 100,000 people took part in the rally. A by-election was held in Nagapattinam, which was won by fellow CPI member K. Murugaiyan (supported by DMK and CPI(M)), who defeated the AIADMK candidate M. Mahalingam (supported by Congress).

1980s
In the 1980 Indian general election two candidates contested the Nagapattinam seat: the incumbent K. Murugaiyan from CPI and Thazhai M. Karunanidhi from DMK. Thazai M. Karunanidhi won the seat, obtaining 50.98% of the votes.

The 1984 Indian general election saw K. Murugaiyan (CPI) and M. Mahalingam (AIADMK) face each other again. M. Mahalingam narrowly won the seat, obtaining 49.91% of the votes, with 49.53% going to K. Murugaiyan and 0.56% to independent candidate S. Arumugam.

Six candidates contested the Nagapattinam seat in the 1989 Indian general election, with the two main candidates being M. Selvarasu of CPI and N.S. Veeramurasu of Congress. The CPI candidate was supported by DMK whilst the Congress candidate was backed by AIADMK. M. Selvarasu won the seat with 49.32% against 46.22% for N.S. Veeramurasu. The victory in Nagapattinam was the sole successful contest for the DMK-led front in Tamil Nadu in 1989, against 38 seats won by the AIADMK-Congress combine.

In the 1991 Indian general election four candidates contested Nagapattinam: the winning Congress candidate Padma (49.71%), the defeated CPI incumbent M. Selvarasu (45.80%), Pattali Makkal Katchi candidate U. Kasinathan (4.27%) and independent candidate K. Ambikapathi (0.23%). Padma was the second woman to be elected to the Lok Sabha from the central districts of Tamil Nadu since Independence.

In the 1996 Indian general election, local issues dominated the campaigns in Nagapattinam. Amongst the 39 Lok Sabha constituencies in Tamil Nadu, Nagapattinam had the lowest number of candidates (6). In 1996 election Nagapattinam had the highest voter turnout percentage in Tamil Nadu at 74%. M. Selvarasu of CPI regained the seat with 56.77% of the votes. The runner-up was M. Kannivannan of Congress (24.90%), followed by V. Thambusamy of CPI(M) (15.56%), S. Rajamani of the Bharatiya Janata Party (2.39%) and two independents.

In 1998 election Nagapattinam was the sole seat allocated to CPI in the DMK-led alliance in Tamil Nadu. Four candidates contested the election. M. Selvarasu of CPI retained the seat, obtaining 58.77% of the votes. The main runner-up was Dr. K. Gopal of AIADMK, a medical doctor and Nannilam state legislator 1991–1996. K. Gopal got 38.23% of the votes, Congress candidate M. Thiagaranjan 2.48% and PT candidate G. Jeevanadam 0.52%.

CPI lost the seat in the 1999 Indian general election, by a margin of 22,466 votes. The outcome was unexpected, as the CPI historically had strong support in the area and the backing of AIADMK in this election. Nagapattinam had elected a CPI parliamentarian in 1989 and 1998, when the state-wide trend had been negative for CPI. DMK candidate A.K.S. Vijayan won the seat with 49.92% of the votes, followed by M. Selvarasu with 46.65%, PT candidate T. Nadaiyazhagan with 3.26% and independent candidate Durai Balaguru with 0.17%. A.K.S. Vijayan is the son of CPI leader A.K. Subbiah.

2000s
In the 2004 Indian general election campaign, water shortages were a major concern in Nagapattinam. By the time, the area had experienced drought since 2001, with ground water levels decreasing. CPI supported DMK candidate A.K.S. Vijayan, the Nagapattinam District Secretary of DMK. A.K.S. Vijayan retained the seat, defeating the AIADMK candidate P.J. Archunan, Janata Dal (United) candidate S.G.M. Ramesh and eight others.

On 10 August 2007 the Delimitation Commission issued an order, retaining Nagapattinam as a constituency reserved for Scheduled Castes. Initial drafts for delimitation had the Nagapattinam Lok Sabha constituency abolished, but in the final decision the constituency remained. After delimitation the communist influence in Nagapattinam decreased, as the Mannargudi segment (with strong CPI and AIADMK influences) was removed from the Nagapattinam Lok Sabha constituency.

In the 2009 Indian general election Nagapattinam again had the lowest number of candidates in Tamil Nadu (7). Apart from the water crisis, two key concerns in the constituency were price rises and insufficiencies in electric power supply. A.K.S. Vijayan of DMK retained the seat with 48.48% of the votes, followed by M. Selvarasu of CPI with 42.20% and M. Muthukumar of DMDK with 6.73%.

Nine candidates contested the Nagapattinam seat in the 2014 Indian general election. CPI contested the Nagapattinam seat without support from neither AIADMK nor DMK for the first time since 1962. Nagapattinam the sole seat in central Tamil Nadu contested by CPI. The party nominated G. Palanisamy, four-time state legislator of Thiruthuraipoondi assembly constituency. His main contenders were Dr. K. Gopal of AIADMK and A.K.S. Vijayan from DMK. Dr. K. Gopal won the seat with 46.06%, followed by 34.81% for A.K.S. Vijayan. Whilst the performance of CPI and CPI(M) candidates in Tamil Nadu in 2014 was generally far below expectations of the left parties, G. Palanisamy managed to come in third place in Nagapattinam with votes in double digits (9.58%).

See also
 Nagapatnam
 List of Constituencies of the Lok Sabha

References

Election Commission of India

External links
Nagapattinam lok sabha  constituency election 2019 date and schedule

Lok Sabha constituencies in Tamil Nadu